Wojcieszyn may refer to the following places in Poland:
Wojcieszyn, Lower Silesian Voivodeship (south-west Poland)
Wojcieszyn, Lublin Voivodeship (east Poland)
Wojcieszyn, Masovian Voivodeship (east-central Poland)
Wojcieszyn, West Pomeranian Voivodeship (north-west Poland)